James Weaver was a member of the Wisconsin State Assembly.

Biography
Weaver was born on October 17, 1800 in Kent, England. He moved to Oneida County, New York in 1830 before eventually settling in Lisbon, Waukesha County, Wisconsin.

In 1820, Weaver had married Elizabeth Fielder. Among their children were Thomas Weaver, a member of the Assembly, and Richard Weaver, a member of the Assembly and of the Wisconsin State Senate. The elder Weaver died on October 8, 1886.

Assembly career
Weaver was a member of the Assembly in 1856, succeeding Joseph Bond. Like Bond, Weaver was a Democrat.

References

External links

People from Kent
English emigrants to the United States
19th-century English politicians
18th-century English people
People from Oneida County, New York
People from Lisbon, Waukesha County, Wisconsin
Democratic Party members of the Wisconsin State Assembly
1800 births
1886 deaths
Burials in Wisconsin
19th-century American politicians